Ryan Cook (born May 8, 1983) is a former American football center who spent eight seasons in the National Football League (NFL). He played college football at the University of New Mexico and was selected in the 2nd round of the 2006 NFL draft by the Minnesota Vikings. He also played for the Miami Dolphins and Dallas Cowboys.

Early years
Cook played offensive tackle for Cibola High School under head coach Ben Shultz. He was a three-year letterman, and earned First Team All-City and Second Team All-State honors as a senior and Second Team All-City as a sophomore. He also accepted an invitation to play in the New Mexico North-South All-Star game.

College career
Cook played for the University of New Mexico for the 2002-2005 seasons. Originally a walk-on, he received a scholarship in his second season. He earned All-Mountain West first team honors at center for three consecutive years, being the first center to do so in New Mexico's history.

In his career, he had 416 knockdown blocks, averaging 8.7 per game in 46 games. As a senior, he was also invited to play in the East-West Shrine Game and the Senior Bowl, accepting the invitation of the latter.

Professional career

Minnesota Vikings (first stint)
Cook was selected by the Minnesota Vikings in the second round (51st overall) of the 2006 NFL Draft. He signed a four-year contract. In the 2007 and 2008 seasons, he was a regular starter at right tackle.

He lost his starting position in the 2009 season to rookie Phil Loadholt. On April 12, 2010, he signed a one-year contract as a restricted free agent and became a starter at right guard.

On August 4, 2011, Cook was re-signed to a two-year contract. On September 3, he was released in the final cuts before the start of the 2011 season.

Miami Dolphins
Cook signed with the Miami Dolphins as a free agent on September 5, 2011. During the season, he played as a backup center and guard. The next year, he was beaten out by rookie Josh Samuda for the backup center role.

On August 31, 2012, he was traded to the Dallas Cowboys, in exchange for a seventh round draft pick (#224-Kevin Dorsey).

Dallas Cowboys
After being with the team less than a week, he was forced to assume the starting center role when Phil Costa aggravated a back injury after the first series of the season opener. He became the starter for the rest of the season, after Costa suffered a partially dislocated ankle in the fifth game against the Carolina Panthers. In the 2013 training camp, he was placed on the injured reserve list after suffering a back injury.

Personal life
Cook is the older brother of Erik Cook, a center who played for the Washington Redskins.  Ryan also has a young daughter who lives in Eden Prairie, Minnesota.

References

External links
Miami Dolphins bio

1983 births
Living people
Players of American football from Albuquerque, New Mexico
American football centers
American football offensive tackles
American football offensive guards
New Mexico Lobos football players
Minnesota Vikings players
Miami Dolphins players
Dallas Cowboys players